The 2009–10 VMI Keydets basketball team represented the Virginia Military Institute during the 2009-10 NCAA Division I men's basketball season. The Keydets were coached by Duggar Baucom in his 5th year at VMI, and played their home games at Cameron Hall. It was VMI's 6th season in the Big South Conference and the Keydets' 102nd season of basketball.

The Keydets failed to improve upon their 24–8 campaign from the previous season, and were defeated in the quarterfinals of the Big South tournament by Coastal Carolina.

Roster

Schedule 

|-
!colspan=9| Regular season

|-
!colspan=9| 2010 Big South Conference men's basketball tournament

References

2009-10 team
2009–10 Big South Conference men's basketball season
2009 in sports in Virginia
2010 in sports in Virginia